The 2003 Brisbane Broncos season was the sixteenth in the history of the Brisbane Broncos. Coached by Wayne Bennett and captained by Gorden Tallis, they competed in the NRL's 2003 Telstra Premiership, finishing the regular season 8th (out of 15) and making the finals for the 12th consecutive year. The Broncos were then knocked out in the first match against eventual premiers, the Penrith Panthers.

Season summary 

In the pre-season Bruno Cullen replaced Shane Edwards as Broncos Chief Executive Officer. The Brisbane Broncos had a strong start to the 2003 season, winning 11 of their first 14 games, but later breaking the club's longest losing streak record by losing their last 8 games straight. Brisbane still made it to the finals, finishing the regular season in 8th position, but lost the Qualifying Final to the Penrith Panthers 28-18. The 2003 season was the first in the Broncos' history in which they lost more games than they won. In the first half of the 2003 season, whilst still at ANZ Stadium, the Broncos were only beaten once (by the New Zealand Warriors in round five). However, upon returning to Suncorp Stadium in round 12, the Broncos only won a home match once (defeating the Sydney Roosters in round 16).

A total of twelve Broncos players were selected to play in the mid-season 2003 State of Origin series, making them the most heavily represented club. Also in 2003 the Rugby Union World Cup was played in Australia. As a testament to the quality of the athletes produced at the Broncos, three of the club's former players would feature in two of the top three finishing teams of the rugby union world's peak competition, all of them having played together in the Broncos' 2000 premiership-winning side: Lote Tuquri with Wendell Sailor for The Wallabies and Brad Thorn for The All Blacks.

The Broncos were once again in the upper echelons of the ladder before losing their last eight games and falling to eighth place, nearly missing the finals for the first time since 1991.

Fullback Darren Lockyer was named the Broncos' player of the season.

Match results 

 *Game following a State of Origin match

Ladder

Scorers 

(*Did not technically score any points.)

Honours

League 
 Nil

Club 
 Player of the year: Darren Lockyer
 Rookie of the year: Neville Costigan
 Back of the year: Darren Lockyer
 Forward of the year: Shane Webcke
 Club man of the year: Graham McColm

References

External links 
 Brisbane Broncos 2003 at sportsphotography.net
 Rugby League Tables and Statistics
 2007 Premiership at rleague.com 

Brisbane Broncos seasons
Brisbane Broncos season